Senator Fielder may refer to:

James Fairman Fielder (1867–1954), New Jersey State Senate
Jennifer Fielder (fl. 2010s), Montana State Senate